Renu, professionally credited as Renadive is an Indian cinematographer, who works in Malayalam cinema.

Early life
Born in Kunnamkulam, on 30 August 1979 as the son of Kallayil Vijayaraghavan, a photographer and Shyamala Vijayaraghavan. Renu holds a diploma in still photography from Indian Institute of Photography. He has worked for Kairali TV channel as a cameraman and covered 148 episodes of Verittakazhchakal with V. K. Sreeraman.

Career
In 2006, he joined cinematographer Alagappan as an assistant cinematographer for the film Agnisakshi (1999 film), followed by films such as Photographer (film), Novel (film), Thalappavu. Later he joined cinematographer Jibu Jacob and worked with him in movies namely Shakespeare M.A. Malayalam, Pranayakalam, Heartbeats. In 2007 he joined the team of Big B (film) and worked as an assistant cinematographer to Sameer Thahir. He also worked in Anwar (2010 film) as an assistant cinematographer. From there on till present has been a part of every single movie directed and produced by Amal Neerad. His talent came into light when he debuted as a Cinematographer in 5 Sundarikal, anthology of 5 movies directed by different directors in which he was the DOP for Kullante Bharya. He was the Associate cameraman and operating cameraman for the next Amal Neerad venture Iyobinte Pusthakam. He is done the  Cinematography for Amal Neerad's Comrade in America.

Filmography

References

Malayalam film cinematographers
1979 births
Living people
People from Thrissur district
Cinematographers from Kerala